Marin Miok (Serbian Cyrillic: Марин Миок; born November 19, 1985) is a Serbian football midfielder.

External links
 Profile at Srbijafudbal 

1985 births
Living people
Footballers from Belgrade
Serbian footballers
Serbian expatriate footballers
Association football midfielders
FK Radnički Pirot players
SC Tavriya Simferopol players
Expatriate footballers in Ukraine
FK Banat Zrenjanin players
Serbian SuperLiga players
FK Ventspils players
Expatriate footballers in Latvia
Serbian expatriate sportspeople in Latvia
FK Sevojno players
FK Radnički Sombor players